Events in the year 2000 in the Palestinian territories.

Incumbents
Palestinian National Authority (non-state administrative authority)
 President – Yasser Arafat (Fatah)

Israeli–Palestinian conflict 

The most prominent events related to the Israeli–Palestinian conflict which occurred during 2000 include:

 July 11–25 – The Camp David 2000 Summit is held which is aimed at reaching a "final status" agreement. The summit collapses after Yasser Arafat would not accept a proposal drafted by American and Israeli negotiators. Ehud Barak is prepared to offer the entire Gaza Strip, part of East Jerusalem as capital of a Palestinian Arab state, 73% of the West Bank (excluding eastern Jerusalem) raising to 90–94% after 10–25 years, and financial reparations for Palestinian Arab refugees for peace. Arafat turns down the offer without making a counter-offer.
 September 28 – Israeli opposition leader Ariel Sharon visits the Temple Mount, protected by a several-hundred-strong Israeli police force. Riots by Palestinian Arabs erupt, leading to a full-fledged armed uprising (called the Al-Aqsa Intifada by sympathizers and the Oslo War by opponents).
 October 12 – 2000 Ramallah lynching – A Palestinian Arab mob lynches two Israel Defense Forces reservists, Vadim Nurzhitz and Yossi Avrahami, who had accidentally entered the Palestinian Authority-controlled city of Ramallah in the West Bank. The brutality of the event, captured in a photo of one of the perpetrators proudly waving his blood-stained hands to the crowd below, sparks international outrage and further intensifies the ongoing conflict between Israel and Palestinian Arabs.

Notable Palestinian militant operations against Israeli targets

The most prominent Palestinian militant acts and operations committed against Israeli targets during 2000 include:

 November 2 – 2 Israelis are killed and 10 are wounded when a car bomb explodes near the Mahane Yehuda Market in Jerusalem, one of whom is the daughter of the MK and former housing minister Yitzhak Levy. Islamic Jihad claims responsibility for the attack.
 November 20 – Kfar Darom bombing: an Israeli school bus was struck by a roadside bomb at the Jewish settlement of Kfar Darom killing 2 adults and injuring several others. Hamas claimed responsibility.
 November 22 – Hadera's main street bombing: Two Israeli women are killed and 60 civilians are wounded in a car bomb attack in Hadera. Hamas claimed responsibility.
 December 22 – Mechola bombing: Palestinian suicide bomber injures 3 Israeli soldiers. Hamas claimed responsibility.

Notable Israeli military operations against Palestinian militancy targets

The most prominent Israeli military counter-terrorism operations (military campaigns and military operations) carried out against Palestinian militants during 2000 include:

 September 30 – Second Intifada: Muhammad al-Durrah incident – Ten Palestinian Arabs are killed during crossfire between Israeli forces and Palestinian Arab militia at the Netzarim junction, among them the twelve-year-old boy Muhammad al-Durrah who is caught in the crossfire and is allegedly killed in the arms of his father. Al-Durrah's death was filmed by a Palestinian Arab freelance cameraman, and as a result Al-Durrah became a symbol of the Palestinian Arab uprising in 2000 and of Palestinian martyrdom. Whether the Israeli forces or the Palestinian Arab militia shot the boy is a matter of dispute.

Deaths
Bashir Barghouti, Communist leader and journalist, died on 9 September
Muhammad al-Durrah, a 12-year-old boy whose death made worldwide headlines, died on 30 September
Vadim Nurzhitz and Yossi Avrahami, Israel Defense Forces reservists, in October in Ramallah

References

See also
 2000 in Israel

 
Palestinian territories
Years of the 21st century in the Palestinian territories
2000s in the Palestinian territories
Palestinian territories